Polish Radio Kielce (Polskie Radio Kielce) - is the regional broadcaster based in Kielce.
Radio Kielce is a part of public radio in Poland Polish Radio.
It can be received in the Świętokrzyskie Voivodeship and partly in neighboring voivodeships.

History

Radio Kielce has started in 1952.

Broadcast Frequencies

External links
 http://www.radio.kielce.pl/
 http://emi.emitel.pl/EMITEL/obiekty.aspx?obiekt=DODR_S3V
 http://emi.emitel.pl/EMITEL/obiekty.aspx?obiekt=DODR_S3T

Radio stations established in 1952
Mass media in Kielce
Polskie Radio